Calixto Bravo Villaso (1790 in Chilpancingo, Guerrero – April 5, 1878 in Mexico City) was a Mexican colonel, he was a cousin of Nicolás Bravo. Bravo served in the Mexican Army during the Mexican War of Independence with José María Morelos. In 1821 he was fighting in the state of Veracruz. In 1846 in the Mexican–American War. He heroically defended the city of Laredo against the United States Army (led by Zachary Taylor), with a small company of only 48 men...

He died in 1878, he was the last survivor from the Mexican War of Independence. His remains were buried at the Panteón de Dolores in Mexico City, in the Rotunda of Illustrious Persons, on April 7, 1878.

References 

1790 births
1878 deaths
Mexican independence activists
People from Chilpancingo
Military personnel from Guerrero